Satyanarayana UDA Lake Park (or Satyanarayana Urban Development Authority Lake Park or Chinaravuru Lake Park), is a park located in Tenali of the Indian state of Andhra Pradesh. It was named after the former chairman of Tenali Municipality, Ravi Satyanarayana.

Administration 
The administration of the park was undertaken by VGTMUDA for developmental activities, which is now dissolved to form APCRDA.

References 

Tourist attractions in Tenali
Parks in India